Joanna Gleason (née Hall; born June 2, 1950) is a Canadian actress and singer. She is a Tony Award–winning musical theatre actress and has also had a number of notable film and TV roles. She's known for originating the role of the Baker's Wife in Stephen Sondheim's Into the Woods for which she won the Tony Award for Best Actress in a Musical. She is also known for her film work in Mike Nichols' Heartburn (1985), Woody Allen's Hannah and Her Sisters (1986), and Crimes and Misdemeanors (1989), and Paul Thomas Anderson's Boogie Nights (1997). She has had television roles in shows such as Friends, The West Wing, The Good Wife and The Affair.

Early life
Joanne Hall was born in Winnipeg, the eldest of three siblings born to television producer and game show personality Monty Hall, and his wife, Marilyn (née Plottel), both of whom died in 2017. He later started his TV career and went on to fame as host of Let's Make a Deal.

In May 1956, the Hall family moved to New York and, in the early 1960s, they moved to Los Angeles.

Hall graduated from Beverly Hills High School in 1968. She was in the school's productions of The Music Man, The Mikado, The Grass Harp, and The Madwoman of Chaillot. In high school, Gleason received acting instruction from John Ingle, the soap opera star, who taught at BHHS from 1955 to 1985. She continued her education at UCLA, then Occidental College, from which she graduated. Gleason has been a teacher herself, holding classes and workshops all over the country.

Career
Although Gleason started her acting career in television, she is best known for her stage and musical theatre work. She made her Broadway debut in 1977 in I Love My Wife, for which she was honored with a Theatre World Award.

Additional Broadway credits include Tom Stoppard's The Real Thing, Peter Nichols' A Day in the Death of Joe Egg, Nick & Nora, Into the Woods (for which she won several awards including a Tony Award in the lead role of the Baker's Wife, which she also played in the PBS Great Performances production of the musical), Dirty Rotten Scoundrels, and The Cartells.

Her film and television career began in 1977 with her first appearance on her father's program Let's Make A Deal. In 1979, she was cast as a supporting character in Hello, Larry, a role she held throughout the oft-maligned sitcom's two-season run. She had film roles in Hannah and Her Sisters and Heartburn (both 1986). In the television movie Still the Beaver she played Beaver's ex-wife, Kimberly. Gleason worked again with Woody Allen in Crimes and Misdemeanors (1989), this time playing the wife of Allen's character. Gleason appeared in several films in the 1990s, including F/X2, Mr. Holland's Opus, Boogie Nights, and The Boys. More recently she has appeared in The Good Wife, Blue Bloods, The Wedding Planner, and The Newsroom. On television, she played the role of Nadine Berkus on the show Love & War (1992–95), several episodes of which she also directed.

She played Joan Silver on Temporarily Yours (1997). Gleason starred in the Lifetime series Oh Baby as Charlotte from 1998 to 2000, also directing episodes of this show. Shortly following the end of this series, she starred opposite Bette Midler and Lindsay Lohan on Bette as agent Connie Randolph. Her numerous guest starring TV credits include episodes of The West Wing, The Practice, King of the Hill, Friends, Password Plus, Tracey Takes On..., Murphy Brown, ER and The Outer Limits. Gleason appeared in six episodes of the Canadian black comedy series Sensitive Skin as Veronica, from 2014 to 2016.

In 2007, Gleason was honoured by the New England Theatre Conference with a Special Award for Achievement in Theatre.

Personal life
Gleason has been married three times. She was married to acting coach Paul G. Gleason (not the actor Paul X. Gleason, also known as Paul Gleason), whose surname she kept professionally, although they divorced on June 28, 1982, in Nevada. Later, she married Michael Bennahum. Gleason has one child, Aaron David Gleason, from her first marriage.

Gleason has been married to actor Chris Sarandon since 1994. The two met while performing in Broadway's short-lived 1991 musical Nick & Nora, returned to the stage together in 1998's Thorn and Bloom, and collaborated on several films, such as Road Ends, Edie & Pen, Let the Devil Wear Black, and American Perfekt.

Gleason's siblings are television writer/director Sharon Hall Kessler and Emmy award-winning television writer/director Richard Hall.

Acting credits

Film

Television

Theatre

Awards and nominations

References

External links
 
 
 
Joanna Gleason – Downstage Center interview at American Theatre Wing.org
TonyAwards.com Interview with Joanna Gleason
 BroadwayWorld: Holtzman's 'Something You Did' Premieres Off-Bway with Gleason

1950 births
Living people
Canadian film actresses
Canadian musical theatre actresses
Canadian stage actresses
Canadian television actresses
Drama Desk Award winners
Jewish Canadian actresses
Occidental College alumni
Tony Award winners
UCLA Film School alumni
Actresses from Winnipeg
20th-century Canadian actresses
21st-century Canadian actresses